QRICH1, also known as Glutamine-rich protein 1, is a protein that in humans is encoded by the QRICH1 gene. One notable feature of this protein is that it contains a Caspase Activation Recruitment Domain, also known as a CARD domain. As a result of having this domain, QRICH1 is believed to be involved in apoptotic, inflammatory, and host-immune response pathways.

Gene
The QRICH1 gene is 64,363 base pairs long, encoding an mRNA transcript that is 3331 bp in length. QRICH1 is located on chromosome 3p21.31 and contains 11 exons. The genomic sequence begins at base pair 49,057,531 and ends at base pair 49,141,201.

Function

The exact function of QRICH1 is not well understood by the scientific community. It is, however, thought to be involved in processes such as inflammation and apoptosis due to the presence of a CARD domain near the beginning of the protein sequence. This protein is predicted to localize to the nucleus and is known to interact with the ATXN1 and ATF7IP proteins shown in the image below.

Protein
The glutamine-rich protein 1 is 776 amino acids in length. Glutamine residues are abundant, comprising 109 of the amino acids or 14% of the protein. The protein contains three distinct domains. The first, a CARD domain, is a member of the death fold superfamily and is involved in apoptosis signaling pathways, immune signaling, inflammation, and host-defense mechanisms. The second domain is a glutamine-rich domain which comprises a majority of the protein and is highly conserved among orthologs. The final domain is a Domain of unknown function (DUF3504) found near the end of the protein sequence. All three of these domains are well conserved throughout strict orthologs.

Predicted Features
Properties of QRICH1 that were predicted using Bioinformatics tools:
 Molecular Weight: 86.5 KDa
 Isoelectric Point: 5.59
Post-translational modification: Multiple phosphorylation sites are reported or predicted. PhosphoSitePlus contains three annotated phosphorylated serines at residues 343, 345, and 659. The NetPhos program on ExPASy predicted 45 phosphorylation sites on multiple serine, threonine, and tyrosine residues. There is one predicted sulfinated tyrosine at amino acid 725.
 No predicted Signal Peptide or signal peptide cleavage.
 Interacting Proteins: ATXN1, Spinocerebellar ataxia type 1 protein, and ATF7IP, activating transcription factor 7-interacting protein 1. ATXN1 is involved in binding RNA in vitro and may be involved in RNA metabolism. ATF7IP is a recruiter protein that couples transcriptional factors to the general transcription apparatus, thereby modulating transcription regulation and chromatin formation.

Expression
QRICH1 is expressed at a high level, 3.3 times the average gene. It is expressed ubiquitously throughout the human body, although EST Profile data reveal that QRICH1 is expressed particularly high in tissues such as the thymus, testis, cerebellar cortex and other areas of the brain, trachea, and in embryonic tissue. Health states such as germ cell tumors, leukemia, lymphoma, and chondrosarcoma have also reported high QRICH1 expression.

Homology

Orthologs
QRICH1 is highly conserved among mammalian orthologs, along with other chordates such as fish, birds, and amphibians. The gene has some conservation among insects, but there were no orthologs found in plants, fungi, or yeast.

Paralogs
QRICH1 has five paralogs all of which encode a zinc finger protein.

References

Uncharacterized proteins
Human proteins